Compton Chine to Steephill Cove is a  Site of Special Scientific Interest which extends from Compton Chine on the south-west coast of the Isle of Wight along the coast, around St. Catherine's Point to Steephill Cove, just west of Ventnor on the south-east coast of the island. This is the largest SSSI area on the island. The site was notified in 2003 for both its biological and geological features.

Sources
Natural England citation sheet

Sites of Special Scientific Interest on the Isle of Wight